Bonaparte's gull (Chroicocephalus philadelphia) is a member of the gull family Laridae found mainly in northern North America.  At  in length, it is one of the smallest species of gull. Its plumage is mainly white with grey upperparts. During breeding season, Bonaparte's gull gains a slaty-black hood. The sexes are similar in appearance.

Taxonomy and etymology 
When George Ord first described Bonaparte's gull in 1815, he gave it the scientific name Sterna philadelphia, assigning it to the genus now used for medium-sized terns. Most later taxonomists assigned it to the genus Larus, a longtime catch-all for most of the gull species. However, in 1858, George Newbold Lawrence moved the species to the genus Chroicocephalus, and some taxonomists followed suit. Recent molecular DNA studies have shown that this species fits neatly into a clade with other "masked gulls", and that it and the slender-billed gull are each other's closest relatives and are basal to the rest of that grouping. Based on these studies, the American Ornithologists' Union, which had previously assigned the species to the genus Larus, moved it into its current genus in 2008. It is monotypic across its range.

The species is named for Charles Lucien Bonaparte, a French ornithologist (and nephew to the former French emperor Napoleon Bonaparte) who spent eight years in America, contributing to the understanding of the taxonomy and nomenclature of birds there and elsewhere. Its genus name, Chroicocephalus, is a combination of the Greek words , an adjective form of  meaning "colour", and  meaning "head". This refers to the dark heads that gulls of this genus show during the breeding season. The specific epithet philadelphia is a Latinized adjective meaning "from Philadelphia", a reference to the location from which the type specimen was collected.

Description 
Bonaparte's gull is among the smallest of the gull species; only little gull and Saunders's gull are smaller. There is no difference in plumage or bare part colour between the sexes, though males tend to be heavier than females. Bonaparte's gull is smaller-bodied, smaller-headed, and smaller-billed than the other common hooded gulls of North America. The adult has grey upperparts and white underparts; its wingtips are black above and pale below. In breeding plumage, it has a slaty black hood, which it loses in non-breeding plumage. Its short, thin bill is black, and its legs are orangish-red.

First year Bonaparte's gulls have the same plumage in winter and summer, but the summer plumage is paler due to wear. Fewer than 5 percent of Bonaparte's gulls acquire a dark hood in their first summer, and on those that do, the hood is duller than on breeding adults.

Distribution and habitat 
Bonaparte's gull breeds in boreal forest across southern Alaska and much of interior western Canada, as far east as central Quebec and south to within  of the United States/Canada border. It avoids dense stands of conifers, instead choosing more open areas, such as the treed edges of bogs, fens, marshes, ponds, or islands. It typically nests within  of open water. It winters along the coasts of North America, and in the Great Lakes. It is a rare vagrant to western Europe and the Azores, where it generally associates with black-headed gulls.
In 2017 a breeding pair was spotted on Iceland.

Behaviour 
They are migratory and most move east or west to coastal waters, also the Great Lakes. They are graceful in flight, more like terns.

Feeding 
Like most gulls, Bonaparte's gull has a varied diet, with prey items changing over the course of the year, and from year to year. During the breeding season, it is largely insectivorous. It is known to quickly congregate in large numbers to take advantage of termite dispersal flights, circling over the emerging swarm and hovering briefly to take the insects in flight. It also gathers in large numbers to feed on the eggs of spawning salmon, alighting on the water and, if necessary, diving to take drifting eggs. During migration and into the winter, insects are first supplemented, then replaced by other food items, including fish, small crustaceans, mollusks, euphausiids, marine worms, and other invertebrates. At least one immature bird has been recorded as having fed on walnut meat. Bonaparte's gulls are known to engage in kleptoparasitism, and have been observed stealing earthworms from foraging dunlins and black-bellied plovers.

Breeding 

Bonaparte's gulls begin breeding at two years of age; they are thought to be monogamous. The breeding season begins in mid-June. Courting pairs perform swooping display flights, calling loudly and diving at each other, and then drop down to perch on a branch. Crouched and facing each other, with neck and crown feathers erected and wings slightly raised, they scream at each other with bills opened wide, bobbing up and down as they do so. This display can continue for several minutes before ending abruptly; afterwards, the birds may sit quietly together for some time before separating again.

Unlike most other gulls, Bonaparte's gulls typically nest in trees — almost exclusively conifers, including black spruce, Atlantic white cedar, tamarack and jack pine. They are only rarely placed on the ground. Adults are aggressive in defending their nests, chasing away even large potential predators such as hawks, common ravens and humans. There is some evidence that human activity in the area of their nests may cause decreased productivity — they are known to travel as far as a kilometer (about a half mile) to mob people, for example — but, contrarily, some choose to nest near human habitation.

They range in colour from pale to medium green, olive or buff, and may be variably marked with spots, blotches, or scrawls of brown, grey, violet, or black; these markings may be fine and evenly distributed over the entire surface of the egg, or thick and concentrated towards the egg's larger end. Studies have shown that breeding populations can be significantly impacted by bad weather. In one multi-year study in Churchill, Manitoba, for example, more than half of the eggs laid in observed nests were blown out of those nests during storms; only 42% of eggs survived to hatching.

Hatchling Bonaparte's gulls are semi-precocial, emerging from their eggs covered with natal down feathers, and with eyes already opened. The down is yellowish-buff, greyer on the flanks and belly, and somewhat pinkish on the breast, with dark brown mottling on the upperparts and head. The bill is blue-black with a pinkish base, and the legs and feet are pinkish-buff. Young birds typically leave the nest within  of hatching, jumping out and following their parents to the nearest open water. Both parents tend the young. The time it takes the young to fledge is unknown. Bonaparte's gulls may live to 18 years.

Voice 

Conservation 
Because of its extremely large range and its increasing population, Bonaparte's gull is listed as a species of least concern by the International Union for Conservation of Nature. In North America, it is protected by the Migratory Bird Treaty Act. Because it occurs in Europe and Africa only as a vagrant, it is not protected by the Agreement on the Conservation of African-Eurasian Migratory Waterbirds. The species is known to be preyed upon by peregrine falcons.

Like many birds, it hosts a number of internal and external parasites. The linguatulid species Reighardia sternae, a tiny, worm-like crustacean, is sometimes found in the gull's air sacs. The acanthocephala worm Corynosoma bipapillum is sometimes found in the bird's posterior gut, as is the intestinal worm Echinostomum spinulosum. Gigantobilharzia lawayi, a schistosome (or blood fluke) may be carried in the capillaries. Externally, it is known to carry several species of lice, including Actornithophilus funebre, Degeeriella atrimarginata, Degeeriella punctata, Menopon species, and Philopterus gonothorax.

References

External links

 
 
 
 
 
 Bonaparte's gull - Larus philadelphia - USGS Patuxent Bird Identification InfoCenter
 
 
 

Bonaparte's gull
Native birds of Alaska
Birds of Canada
Bonaparte's gull
Taxa named by George Ord
Taxobox binomials not recognized by IUCN